Johannes Andersen (1890–1980) was a Danish hornist and composer. He wrote a number of pieces for orchestra, as well as a handful of chamber works.

References

Male composers
Danish classical horn players
1890 births
1980 deaths
20th-century Danish composers
20th-century Danish male musicians